Navashino is a town in Nizhny Novgorod Oblast, Russia, located on a branch of the Oka River, 10 km east of Murom and  southwest of Nizhny Novgorod. As of the 2010 Census, its population was 16,416.

History
The town of Navashino was founded in 1957 by merging two neighboring settlements of Mordovshchikovo and Lipnya and named after the nearby railway station of Navashino. A railway was built in the area in 1912.

Administrative and municipal status
Within the framework of administrative divisions, it is, together with fifty rural localities, incorporated as the town of oblast significance of Navashino—an administrative unit with the status equal to that of the districts. As a municipal division, the town of oblast significance of Navashino is incorporated as Navashinsky Urban Okrug.

Until May 2015, the town served as the administrative center of Navashinsky District and, within the framework of administrative divisions, was incorporated within that district as a town of district significance. As a municipal division, it was incorporated as Navashino Urban Settlement within Navashinsky Municipal District.

Economy
OAO Okskaya Sudoverf is headquartered in Navashino. The shipbuilding company, originating from a local shipyard founded in 1907, builds boats for Volga and sea navigation. Some of their tankers are to be sold to customers as far afield as Malaysia's Petronas, which plans to use the vessels at its Caspian subsidiary.

Transportation
A new road bridge over the Oka River was opened in October 2009 near Navashino.

References

Notes

Sources

Cities and towns in Nizhny Novgorod Oblast
Muromsky Uyezd